Raven Records was a Canadian record label established by Wyn Anderson, that existed from 1995 until Anderson's death in 1999.  It is notable as being the label on which later recordings of the band Thundermug and of reggae singer Gregory Isaacs were released in Canada.

History

Raven Records was established by Wyn Anderson in 1995, and operated from a farmhouse outside of London, Ontario, Canada.  The label released Thundermug's last two albums, Who's Running My World (1995) and Bang The Love Drum (1997), as well as Gregory Issacs' Happy As A King (1997).

References

Record labels established in 1995
Defunct record labels of Canada